Josef Rabas (17 July 1898 – 30 June 1965) was a Czech equestrian. He competed at the 1924 Summer Olympics and the 1928 Summer Olympics.

References

External links
 

1898 births
1965 deaths
Czech male equestrians
Olympic equestrians of Czechoslovakia
Equestrians at the 1924 Summer Olympics
Equestrians at the 1928 Summer Olympics
Place of birth missing
Sportspeople from the Plzeň Region